The Lake Tahoe Railway and Transportation Company was a ,  narrow gauge railroad that ran from a connection with the Central Pacific Railway at Truckee, California to the waterfront at Lake Tahoe. The railroad operated its own property from 1899 until October 16, 1925, at which time it was leased to the Southern Pacific Company, which bought the property outright in May 1933. SP abandoned the line in 1943.

The Lake Tahoe Railway and Transportation Company operated a narrow gauge railroad between Truckee and Lake Tahoe, California assembled from equipment formerly used on the Lake Tahoe Railroad of Glenbrook, Nevada.  A separate company known as the Lake Tahoe Railway proposed to build a  standard gauge line northeast from Placerville to Pino Grande and then Lake Tahoe but construction never commenced.

Timeline

December 19, 1898 – Railway Incorporated
May 1, 1900 – Operations commence between Truckee and Lake Tahoe
October 16, 1925 – Railway leased to Southern Pacific Railroad
May 15, 1926 – Line converted to Standard Gauge by SP
May 1933 – Railway sold to SP
November 10, 1943 – Line abandoned by SP

Route
The railroad followed the Truckee River approximately via the modern route of State Route 89.
Truckee - Interchange with Southern Pacific
Deer Creek
Squaw Valley
Tahoe Wharf
Tahoe City
Tahoe Wharf

Ward Creek Branch
Ward Creek

Motive Power
The LT RR had four used  gauge Baldwin locomotives that operated on the line.

See also
List of defunct California railroads

References

 
 
 
 

Lake Tahoe
Defunct California railroads
3 ft gauge railways in the United States
Narrow gauge railroads in California
Predecessors of the Southern Pacific Transportation Company
Railway companies established in 1898
Railway companies disestablished in 1933
History of the Sierra Nevada (United States)
1898 establishments in California